Baschet is a French surname. Notable people with the surname include:

 Baschet Brothers, French musical instrument makers François Baschet (1920–1914) and Bernard Baschet (1917–2015)
 Marcel Baschet (1862–1941), French painter

See also
 Cristal baschet, musical instrument

French-language surnames